George Thomas Augustus Adkins (21 August 1910 – 24 May 1976) was a New Zealand rugby union player. A prop, Adkins represented South Canterbury at a provincial level, and was a member of the New Zealand national side, the All Blacks, from 1935 to 1936. He never played a full test but was part of the 1935–36 New Zealand rugby union tour of Britain, Ireland and Canada playing against local sides.

A draper before serving with the RNZAF in the Pacific during World War II, Adkins was subsequently a senior civil servant with the Department of Labour.

Adkins died in Timaru on 24 May 1976.

References 

1910 births
1976 deaths
Rugby union players from Timaru
New Zealand rugby union players
New Zealand international rugby union players
Rugby union props
New Zealand military personnel of World War II